Smartfinance is an independent financial comparison website for helping consumers in emerging markets to make the most of their money. The website enables consumers to compare prices on a range of products, including mortgages, credit cards, bank accounts, savings products and loans as well as providing a range of calculators and advice.

Smartfinance acts as an independent guide for consumers faced with information overload, with an agenda to champion the interests of consumers and to improve market transparency.

Smartfinance Mission
Smartfinance aims to be the default destination for any consumer seeking advice regarding a personal finance choice.

History 
Smartfinance was founded in 2008 having witnessed the tremendous growth of aggregator sites in mature economies. The founders believed that the service offered would be of particular relevance to emerging economies where there is typically a far lower level of understanding of financial products and little or no opportunity for consumers to access independent advice.

The launch territory for the business was Vietnam in 2009. With a small team based in Hanoi, Smartfinance has had to raise awareness among both consumers and product providers. By August 2009, Smartfinance.vn covered a wide range of products from Savings through to Credit Cards and Insurance, with prices provided by over 50 different institutions.

Smartfinance.sg launched in April 2010, and the business will deploy the portal to other Asian and emerging markets during 2009–2011.

Each country serviced has a dedicated site to ensure that all local legislation, regulatory requirements and market conditions are catered for.

Operations

Criticisms 
Smartfinance has been criticized for not including all products on the market and therefore any price comparisons are not 100% comprehensive. However, it chooses to only display prices from financial institutions that have agreed to share their data, and more importantly, keep it updated in real time. This ensures Smartfinance data is always the most accurate source of market information. At the current time Smartfinance covers over 75 institutions in Vietnam who are collectively estimated to account for over 90% of market share for retail products.

External links 
 http://www.smartfinance.vn

Economics websites